Transmission is an English experimental/post-rock band based in the United Kingdom. The band includes former members of Killing Joke, Murder, Inc., The Verve, and Dreadzone.

Band members
Tim Bran - vocals, keyboards
Paul Ferguson - drums
Simon Tong - guitar
Youth bass, guitar

Discography
Noctolucent EP (2006)
Beyond Light (2006)
Sublimity (2008)

External links
 Transmission's official on Myspace
 

Killing Joke
English experimental musical groups
English post-rock groups
Rock music supergroups
British supergroups